The Hong Kong Bar Association (HKBA) is the professional regulatory body for barristers in Hong Kong. The Law Society of Hong Kong is the equivalent association for solicitors in Hong Kong.

Victor Dawes SC is the current chairman of the Council of the HKBA.

History

According to its website, the Hong Kong Bar Association was founded in 1949. However, a newspaper advertisement from March 1948 records the foundation of the association on 12 March 1948 with Mr Eldon Potter KC being elected President, Mr H.D. Sheldon KC being elected chairman and Mr Percy Chen being elected Secretary Treasurer. The offices of the Association were located in the offices of Mr Chen in Prince's Building, Hong Kong.

Role

The objects of the Hong Kong Bar Association are generally to consider and to take proper action on all matters affecting the legal profession and the administration of justice. These include:

 the maintenance of the honour and independence of the Bar;
 the improvement of the administration of justice in Hong Kong;
 the prescribing of rules of professional conduct, discipline and etiquette;
 furtherance of good relations and understanding within the legal profession.

Like other professional bodies, the HKBA has the authority to take disciplinary action to the members who breach the Code of Conduct of the Association. The Law Society of Hong Kong is the equivalent association for solicitors in Hong Kong.

Route to entry

Students must first complete a basic degree in law, such as the Bachelor of Laws (LLB), Juris Doctor (JD) or convert from another first degree with the Common Professional Examination (CPE).

They must then complete the Postgraduate Certificate in Laws (PCLL) at The University of Hong Kong, the City University of Hong Kong or The Chinese University of Hong Kong. From 2008 onwards, all overseas applicants to the PCLL must satisfy each element of the PCLL conversion programme.

After finishing PCLL, prospective barristers will enter pupillage with a pupilmaster for a year; after half a year they will gain rights of audience in court.

Overseas barristers may, having at least three years' experience, take the Barristers Qualification Examination to officially become a Hong Kong barrister.

Additionally, lawyers of at least three years' qualified experience may apply to switch membership of either the HKBA or The Law Society of Hong Kong. However, one may not enjoy membership of both entities at once. For example, the No. 1 ranked barrister in seniority in 2007, Sir John Swaine SC, switched to become a solicitor in 2002, but switched back in 2004. Solicitors seeking to qualify as barrister are required to do pupillage, however, the period may be shortened for those with substantial advocacy experience.

Number of practising barristers

As of January 2022, there were 98 Senior Counsel (88 male, 10 female), and 1,500 (1,300 male, 470 female) junior barristers in practice at the private bar in Hong Kong. There were 88 pupil barristers of whom 51 were male and 37 female.

Senior Counsel

After gaining ten years' experience as a barrister or government counsel in Hong Kong, a barrister admitted in Hong Kong may apply to become a Senior Counsel (SC) (資深大律師). Time in practice as a barrister or lawyer in another jurisdiction or as a solicitor in private practice in Hong Kong does not count. The Law Society of Hong Kong has called for this to be changed, so that solicitors may also be appointed Senior Counsel.

In colonial Hong Kong before 1997, the title was instead Queen's Counsel (QC) (御用大律師). After the transfer of sovereignty, Queen's Counsel who had been appointed QC in HK or British Queen's Counsel who had been admitted to practice in Hong Kong generally prior to the handover became Senior Counsel automatically.

List of chairpersons
By year:
 1948 Eldon Potter KC, President, Harold Sheldon KC, Chairman
 1949 Harold Sheldon KC 
 1950 Charles Loseby KC 
 1951 Leo D'Almada KC 
 1952 John McNeill KC/QC 
 1953 Charles Loseby QC 
 1954 Leo D'Almada QC 
 1955 John McNeill QC 
 1956 John McNeill QC
 1957 Leo D'Almada QC 
 1958 John McNeill QC
 1959 Leo D'Almada QC 
 1960 Lo Hin Shing
 1961 Leo D'Almada QC
 1962 Leo D'Almada QC 
 1963 Brook Bernacchi QC 
 1964 S.V. Gittins 
 1965 S.V. Gittins 
 1966 Oswald Cheung QC
 1967 S.V. Gittins QC 
 1968 Gerald de Basto QC 
 1969 Gerald de Basto QC 
 1970 Gerald de Basto QC 
 1971 Henry Litton QC 
 1972 Henry Litton QC 
 1973 Gerald de Basto QC 
 1974 Archie Zimmern QC
 1975 Charles Ching QC
 1976 Charles Ching QC
 1977 Henry Litton QC 
 1978 Henry Litton QC 
 1979 Henry Litton QC 
 1980 Martin Lee QC
 1981 Martin Lee QC
 1982 Martin Lee QC
 1983 Henry Litton QC 
 1984 Henry Litton QC 
 1985 Denis Chang QC
 1986 Denis Chang QC
 1987 Denis Chang QC
 1988 Robert Tang QC
 1989 Robert Tang QC
 1990 Anthony Rogers QC 
 1991 Anthony Rogers QC 
 1992 Jacqueline Leong QC 
 1993 Jacqueline Leong QC
 1994 Ronny Wong QC
 1995 Gladys Li QC
 1996 Gladys Li QC
 1997 Audrey Eu QC, SC
 1998 Audrey Eu SC
 1999 Ronny Tong SC
 2000 Ronny Tong SC
 2001 Alan Leong SC
 2002 Alan Leong SC
 2003 Edward Chan SC
 2004 Edward Chan SC
 2005 Philip Dykes SC 
 2006 Philip Dykes SC 
 2007 Rimsky Yuen SC
 2008 Rimsky Yuen SC
 2009 Russell Coleman SC
 2010 Russell Coleman SC
 2011 Kumar Ramanathan SC
 2012 Kumar Ramanathan SC
 2013 Paul Shieh SC
 2014 Paul Shieh SC
 2015 Winnie Tam SC
 2016 Winnie Tam SC
 2017 Paul Lam SC
 2018 Philip Dykes SC
 2019 Philip Dykes SC
 2020 Philip Dykes SC
 2021 Paul Harris SC
 2022 Victor Dawes SC
 2023 Victor Dawes SC

By chairs (current chair in bold)

 Harold Sheldon, KC (1948–49)
 Charles Loseby, KC, QC (1950, 53)
 Leo D'Almada, KC, QC (1951, 54, 57, 59, 61-62)
 John McNeill, QC (1952, 55-56, 58)
 Lo Hin Shing (1960)
 Brook Bernacchi, QC (1963)
 S.V. Gittins (1964–65, 67)
 Oswald Cheung, QC (1966)
 Gerald de Basto, QC (1968–70, 73)
 Henry Litton, QC (1971–72, 77-79, 83-84)
 Archie Zimmern, QC (1974)
 Charles Ching, QC (1975–76)
 Martin Lee, QC (1980–82)
 Denis Chang, QC (1985–87)
 Robert Tang, QC (1988–89)
 Anthony Rogers, QC (1990–91)
 Jacqueline Leong, QC (1992–93)
 Ronny Wong, QC (1994)
 Gladys Li, QC (1995–96)
 Audrey Eu, QC, SC (1997–98)
 Ronny Tong, SC (1999-2000)
 Alan Leong, SC (2001–02)
 Edward Chan, SC (2003–04)
 Philip Dykes, SC (2005–06, 2018–20)
 Rimsky Yuen, SC (2007–08)
 Russell Coleman, SC (2009–10)
 Kumar Ramanathan, SC (2011–12)
 Paul Shieh, SC (2013–14)
 Winnie Tam, SC (2015–16)
 Paul Lam, SC (2017)
Paul Harris, SC (2021)
Victor Dawes, SC (2022– )

Notable Cases

Admission of overseas counsel for Jimmy Lai 
In September 2022, the HKBA (along with the Secretary for Justice) opposed an application by Jimmy Lai to instruct a King’s Counsel in the UK to represent him in his trial in Hong Kong, stating that "the well established criteria for admitting overseas counsel on an ad hoc basis are not met." 

In November 2022, after the Court of Final Appeal ruled to allow Tim Owen KC to be admitted as an overseas counsel on an ad hoc basis, the Chief Executive of Hong Kong, John Lee, made a request to the NPCSC for an interpretation of the national security law over whether overseas counsel are allowed to take part in national security cases. 

The HKBA chairman Victor Dawes SC said at a media briefing that "the national security law is a relatively new piece of legislation and we hope that any ambiguity can be clarified by our courts in the future and the power to interpret… be exercised sparingly" whilst noting that "I do understand the government's position and the reasoning given by the chief executive." He dismissed suggestions that disallowing overseas barristers in national security cases would undermine defendants' rights and freedom in legal representation, saying there are sufficient lawyers in the city to handle such cases. Dawes also said that the incident would not damage Hong Kong's judicial independence.

See also
 Law Society of Hong Kong
 Bar association
 Bar council
 Postgraduate Certificate in Laws

References

External links 
Hong Kong Bar Association Official homepage
Code of Conduct of the Hong Kong Bar

Bar Association
Bar associations of Asia
1949 establishments in Hong Kong
Professional associations based in Hong Kong
Barristers of Hong Kong
Organizations established in 1949